Homophylotis is a genus of moths of the family Zygaenidae.

Species
Homophylotis thyridota Turner, 1904
Homophylotis pseudothyridota Tarmann, 2005
Homophylotis artonoides Tarmann, 2005
Homophylotis doloides (Pagenstecher, 1900) (Bismarck Archipelago)

References

Procridinae
Zygaenidae genera